Like Family is an American sitcom television series that aired on The WB from September 19, 2003 to April 22, 2004. The series stars Holly Robinson Peete and Kevin Michael Richardson and lasted one season. Like Family was created and produced by Dan Fogelman, and executive produced by Warren Littlefield, Kenny Schwartz, and Rick Weiner.

Synopsis
Holly Robinson Peete stars as Tanya Jones, the matriarch of a middle-class African American family that live in suburban New Jersey. Tanya's family includes husband Ed (Kevin Michael Richardson), their 12-year-old son Bobby (B.J. Mitchell) and 16-year-old daughter Danika (Megalyn Echikunwoke). Rounding out the family is Ed's father,  Ed "Pop" Jones (J Anthony Brown), an opinionated and feisty senior citizen.

When Tanya's closest friend Maddie Hudson (Diane Farr), a Caucasian single mom, hits a rough patch, Tanya and her family invite Maddie and her 16-year-old son Keith (J. Mack Slaughter, Jr.) to live with them. Episodes focus on the problems and comical situations arising from both families living and working together.

The series was cancelled after all but one of the 22 episodes produced were aired.

Cast
 Holly Robinson Peete as Tanya Ward
 Kevin Michael Richardson as Ed Ward
 Diane Farr as Maddie Hudson
 J. Mack Slaughter, Jr. as Keith Hudson
 J. Anthony Brown as Ed "Pop" Ward
 Megalyn Echikunwoke as Danika Ward
 B.J. Mitchell as Bobby Ward

Nielsen ratings

Episodes

Syndication
On June 8, 2009, reruns of the series began airing on TV One in the United States.

Awards and nominations

References

External links 
 
 

2000s American black sitcoms
2003 American television series debuts
2004 American television series endings
English-language television shows
Television series about families
Television series created by Dan Fogelman
Television shows set in New Jersey
Television series by Warner Bros. Television Studios
The WB original programming